Marahuacaea is a group of plants in the family Rapateaceae described as a genus in 1984.

The only known species is Marahuacaea schomburgkii, native to the Cerro Marahuaca in the State of Amazonas in Venezuela).

References

Monotypic Poales genera
Rapateaceae
Flora of Venezuela